Nikolay Nikolaevich Zubov was a Russian naval officer, engineer, geographer, oceanographer and polar explorer.
In 1901, Zubov joined the Sea Cadet Corps and in 1904, participated in the Russo-Japanese War. He was severely wounded in the Battle of Tsushima.
In 1910, he obtained a degree in hydrography from the Navy Academy and took part in a 1912 expedition to Novaya Zemlya.
He carried out many more expeditions into the arctic and in 1945 he was awarded the title of Engineer Rear admiral.

Selected publications
 Морские воды и льды (Sea Waters and Ice), 1938

References 

1885 births
1960 deaths
Russian military personnel of the Russo-Japanese War
Russian oceanographers
Naval Cadet Corps alumni